Andrea Kule (born 2 July 1990) is an Albanian football player who most recently played for Tërbuni Pukë in the Albanian First Division.

References

External links
 Profile - FSHF

1990 births
Living people
Sportspeople from Berat
Association football defenders
Albanian footballers
Albania under-21 international footballers
FK Tomori Berat players
KF Luz i Vogël 2008 players
KF Naftëtari Kuçovë players
KS Lushnja players
FK Dinamo Tirana players
KF Laçi players
KS Kastrioti players
KF Tërbuni Pukë players
Kategoria Superiore players
Kategoria e Parë players
20th-century Albanian sportspeople
21st-century Albanian sportspeople